The following lists events that happened in 1916 in Iceland.

Incumbents
Minister – Einar Arnórsson

Events

5 August – Icelandic parliamentary election, August 1916
21 October – Icelandic parliamentary election, October 1916
21 October – Icelandic community service referendum, 1916

1916 Úrvalsdeild

Births

6 December – Kristján Eldjárn, politician (d. 1982).

7 December – Sigurður Ólafsson, footballer (d. 1993)

21 December – Brandur Brynjólfsson, footballer (d. 1999).

Deaths

11 July – Jón Ólafsson, editor, journalist, and poet (b. 1850)

References

 
1910s in Iceland
Iceland
Iceland
Years of the 20th century in Iceland